Coalville East railway station was a station on the Charnwood Forest Railway. It served the town of Coalville, Leicestershire, England.

History

The station was opened by the Charnwood Forest Railway (CFR) on 16 April 1883. It was the start of their line to Loughborough. The CFR was operated by the London and North Western Railway (LNWR) from the outset, but remained independent until absorbed into the London, Midland and Scottish Railway (LMS), of which the LNWR was a constituent, at the 1923 Grouping.

The station was closed in 1931 when the passenger services on the line with withdrawn.

Today, the site of Coalville East station has been built over by housing, with sections of the line either built on or converted for use as public bridleways.

References

Route 

Disused railway stations in Leicestershire
Former London and North Western Railway stations
Railway stations in Great Britain opened in 1883
Railway stations in Great Britain closed in 1931
East Railway Station